was a Japanese novelist and member of the Japanese Communist Party. He wrote "My war crimes", which is the origin of a dispute over comfort women 30 years after World War II; he admitted that portions of his work had been made up in an interview with Shūkan Shinchō on May 29, 1996. Later, his fictional work was used by George Hicks in his "The Comfort Women: Japan's Brutal Regime of Enforced Prostitution in the Second World War".

Early life
Originally from Yamaguchi Prefecture on the Sea of Japan, Yoshida was stationed in Korea, then a colony of Japan, during World War II; he claimed that he assisted police to kidnap over 2,000 women from various rural areas of the Korean peninsula to serve as comfort women. After the war, he ran as a Japanese Communist Party candidate in the 1947 Shimonoseki city council elections, but was defeated.

Memoirs controversy
In 1977 and again in 1983, Yoshida published memoirs about his actions during the war. His books and a subsequent 1991 media interview have been credited with bringing about an apology to Korea by Foreign Affairs minister Yōhei Kōno. As Yoshida's memoirs became widely known, he began to attract suspicion. Ikuhiko Hata, a historian at Takushoku University and one of Yoshida's leading critics, pointed to inconsistencies between Yoshida's 1977 and 1983 memoirs, using these to assert that his claims are fabricated. Ikuhiko Hata also threw doubt on the fact that Yuto Yoshida was carried on the list of 1931 graduates from Moji Commercial School as deceased. South Korean newspaper interviews with residents of Jeju Island, where the forced recruitment allegedly took place, found no one who admitted to remembering a sweep through a button factory there which Yoshida detailed in his 1983 memoirs.

In May 1996, weekly magazine Shūkan Shinchō published remarks by Yoshida made to them in an interview, admitting that portions of his work had been made up. He stated that "There is no profit in writing the truth in books. Hiding the facts and mixing your own assertions into the story is something that newspapers do too". The publisher of his book, Sanichi Shobou, also admitted that it was a novel, while being interviewed by NHK. In June 2009, Lee Young-hoon, a professor of Seoul National University, argued that Yoshida's testimony has spread among Korean society after Yoshida published books.

Tessa Morris-Suzuki and others argue that historians seeking to deny or downplay the existence of comfort women commonly mention Yoshida and his testimony since then and that the inaccuracy of Yoshida's claims are used to cast doubt on the existence or extent of forced prostitution under Japanese rule in World War II.

On August 5, 2014, Asahi Shimbun announced that they came to the conclusion that the testimony of Yoshida was a fabrication. In April and May 2014, the Asahi Shimbun dispatched reporters to Jeju Island and interviewed about 40 elderly residents and concluded that Yoshida's accounts "are false" because they did not found supporting evidence for it. Asahi Shimbun retracted all 16 articles based on his testimony in the 1980s and 1990s. The President of Asahi Shimbun later made an apology for the errors and an editor was fired as a result.

According to his son's testimony in the Sankei Shimbun,  he was poor before publishing and worked for a bakery run by a Korean. Yoshida frequently applied for essay contests for prize money and he won by a fictional story about slavery workforce during the war. Later, this story was used by Korea University educator  and quoted in “Record of Korean forced compulsion”.

Yoshida's memoirs

Impact
In 1982, The Asahi Shimbun reported the remarks of Yoshida for the first time.

In 1992, The New York Times reported Yoshida's confession.
In 1995, Australian journalist George L. Hicks wrote a book titled The Comfort Women: Sex Slaves of the Japanese Imperial Forces. In his book, he states that slave hunting was conducted whenever other methods failed, based on Yoshida's book.
In 1996, Radhika Coomaraswamy compiled a report so called Coomaraswamy report for U.N. Commission on Human Right. In the report, the testimony of Yoshida was used as an evidence of abduction of Korean women organized by the Japanese Government.

In 1999, Patricia Morley wrote in her book titled The Mountain is Moving: Japanese Women's Lives that the official involvement of the government of Japan citing Yoshida's confession.

Some historians say the impact of the Yoshida's testimonies were minimal because they have been refuted and rejected by virtually all historians during the 1990s. However they are often cited by influential reports and media after 2000. Some examples are as follows:
In 2001, Therese Park who is an author of A Gift of the Emperor wrote that Yoshida's book validated what she was writing about comfort women in her writing  To Give a Voice in a book titled Legacies of the Comfort Women of World War II.

In 2004, Takesato Watanabe a professor of Doshisha University accused Akira Nakamura's statement "no one has ever claimed that the comfort women were gathered up en masses in urban areas." citing Yoshida's books in his book titled A Public Betrayed: An Inside Look at Japanese Media Atrocities and Their Warnings to the West.
 In 2006, his book was used as an evidence for the abduction of women in a Congressional Report which was prepared for the United States House of Representatives House Resolution 121 in 2007.

 In 2007, The Chosun Ilbo reported the Yoshida's testimonies in response to Japanese Prime Minister Shinzo Abe's statement at a parliamentary panel that Japan will not issue an apology for forcing women to act as sex slaves for its soldiers during World War II:

 In 2007, JoongAng Ilbo wrote about the Kono Statement which was criticized as being based on the false testimony of Yoshida. JoongAng Ilbo insisted that not all the testimony was fabricated saying "However, Yoshida didn't deny the forced mobilization itself. He erected a monument of apology in Cheonan in South Korea at his own expense."
In 2009, Young-hee Shim claimed that Yoshida confessed because of a traditional Buddhist belief that one should confess to one's sins and crimes before death in a book titled Legal Institutions and Collective Memories.
 In 2012. The Chosun Ilbo introduced the book of Yoshida in detail as an evidence of the abduction and forced roundup of comfort women by the Japanese military. The article was translated into Japanese and Chinese, and further published in Korea Focus in English.

Works

Translated into Korean as

See also

References

External links 
 Thinking about the comfort women issue, Look squarely at essence of 'comfort women' issue. 2014 Aug. 22, Asahi Shimbun
 Testimony about 'forcible taking away of women on Jeju Island': Judged to be fabrication because supporting evidence not found 2012 Aug. 22, Asahi Shimbun

1913 births
2000 deaths
Comfort women
Japanese activists
Japanese communists
Japanese fraudsters
Japanese military personnel of World War II
Japanese writers
People from Yamaguchi Prefecture
20th-century hoaxes
Hoaxes in Japan